Events from the year 1994 in Jordan.

Incumbents
Monarch: Hussein 
Prime Minister: Abdelsalam al-Majali

Events

Israel–Jordan peace treaty.

Establishments

 Zarqa University.

See also

 Years in Iraq
 Years in Syria
 Years in Saudi Arabia

References

 
1990s in Jordan
Jordan
Jordan
Years of the 20th century in Jordan